Clarence Roy "Dick" Behling (March 16, 1916 – July 24, 1994) was a Canadian ice hockey player. He played 5 games in the National Hockey League with the Detroit Red Wings during the 1940–41 and 1942–43 seasons. The rest of is career, which lasted from 1936 to 1951, was spent in the minor leagues. He also played for the Kitchener-Waterloo Dutchmen, the Indianapolis Capitals, the Detroit Holzbaugh-Fords, the Harringay Greyhounds and the Baltimore Orioles.

Career statistics

Regular season and playoffs

References

External links

1916 births
1994 deaths
Baltimore Orioles (ice hockey) players
Canadian expatriates in the United States
Canadian ice hockey defencemen
Detroit Red Wings players
Harringay Greyhounds players
Ice hockey people from Ontario
Indianapolis Capitals players
Kitchener Greenshirts players
Ontario Hockey Association Senior A League (1890–1979) players
Sportspeople from Kitchener, Ontario